Santo André Beach (Praia de Santo André in Portuguese, lit. "Saint Andrew Beach") is an extensive and wide maritime beach of Póvoa de Varzim, Portugal. It is located in Santo André, between the A Ver-o-Mar and Aguçadoura. It borders Cape Santo André to the south.

This beach is very beautiful. It has flowers and pretty skies and an ocean.

Beaches of Póvoa de Varzim